British Library, Add MS 14467, is a Syriac manuscript of the New Testament, according to the Peshitta version, on parchment. Palaeographic analysis has dated the manuscript to the 10th century.

Description 

The manuscript contains the fragments of Gospel of Matthew (folios 1-8) and Gospel of John (folios 9-15), according to the Peshitta version, with Arabic translation, on 15 leaves (10 by 6¾ inches). The writing is in two columns per page, 26-37 lines per page. The Syriac column is written in Nestorian character, with occasional vowel-points and signs of punctuation, the Arabic column has a few diacritical points.

 Contents
 Matthew 7:22-11:1; 11:22-12:10; 16:21-17:13;
 John 8:59-10:18; 16:13-18:3; 19:27-20:25.

The larger sections are marked both in the Syriac and Arabic texts.

The manuscript was brought from the covenant of St. Mary Deipara, in the Nitrian Desert.

The manuscript is housed at the British Library (Add MS 14467) in London.

See also 

 List of the Syriac New Testament manuscripts
 Syriac versions of the Bible
 Biblical manuscript
 Codex Phillipps 1388
 British Library, Add MS 14455
 British Library, Add MS 14459
 British Library, Add MS 14466

References

Further reading 

 William Wright, Catalogue of the Syriac manuscripts in the British Museum (1870, reprint: Gorgias Press 2002), pp. 66-67.

Peshitta manuscripts
10th-century biblical manuscripts
Add. 14467